Richmond railway station is the junction for the Alamein, Belgrave, Cranbourne, Frankston, Glen Waverley, Lilydale, Pakenham and Sandringham lines in Victoria, Australia. It serves the inner south-eastern Melbourne suburb of Richmond, and it opened on 8 February 1859 as Punt Road. It was renamed Swan Street on 12 December 1859, and renamed Richmond on 1 January 1867.

History

Richmond station has been relocated and rebuilt four times. The first station was at ground level, and opened on 8 February 1859 as Punt Road. It closed in the same year, on 12 December. On the same day, a new station called Swan Street, also at ground level, opened. It was re-named Richmond on 1 January 1867. In 1885, an elevated station was opened just north of Swan Street, with six platforms.

By the 1930s, the station was struggling to cope with patronage. The 1940 Ashworth Improvement Plan recommended that it be rebuilt, but funding problems during World War II prevented that from happening. The station had also deteriorated to the point that it was condemned by the local council. In the 1950s, work began on a replacement, as part of Operation Phoenix, the postwar rebuilding of the Victorian Railways. However, it was not until 26 March 1960 that the present station was completed. Located slightly west of the previous station, the bridges at each end of the station, across Punt Road and Swan Street, were also rebuilt to accommodate the ten tracks. For a time, platforms at both the old and new stations were used, before the original station was closed and demolished.

In 1973, the flyover for the Down Burnley local line was built at the Up end of Platforms 9 and 10, with the junction to the east of Platforms 7, 8, 9 and 10 abolished in the same year.

The station was the filming location for the opening scene of the 1992 Australian film Romper Stomper. In the film's story, the station was named Footscray.

In 1994, major re-signalling works occurred between Richmond and South Yarra. On 4 December 1996, Richmond was upgraded to a Premium Station.

During 2015, the verandahs on all platforms were lengthened and roofs installed over the ramps leading to the pedestrian subway at the Up end of the station. The additional verandahs filled in the gaps between existing verandahs, giving passengers coverage against inclement weather and reduce overcrowding.

During the 2018/2019 Financial Year, it was the ninth-busiest station in metropolitan Melbourne, with 4.17 million boardings per year.

Platforms, facilities and services

Richmond has ten platforms; five island platforms with ten faces. It is built on an embankment immediately east of Punt Road, with platforms extending west across the Punt Road railway bridge. The station is connected by three subways, with access to the platforms by ramps. There are no lifts at the station.

The station is located in Melbourne's sporting precinct. A special-events entrance at the western end is opened during events at the Melbourne Cricket Ground, Melbourne Park and AAMI Park.

It is serviced by Metro Trains' Alamein, Belgrave, Cranbourne, Frankston, Glen Waverley, Lilydale, Pakenham and Sandringham line services.

Platform 1:
  all stations services to Flinders Street

Platform 2:
  all stations services to Sandringham

Platform 3:
  all stations services to Flinders Street, Werribee and Williamstown

Platform 4:
  all stations and limited express services to Frankston

Platform 5:
  all stations services to Flinders Street
  all stations services to Flinders Street
  V/Line services to Southern Cross (set down only)

Platform 6:
  express services to Pakenham
  express services to Cranbourne
  V/Line services to Traralgon and Bairnsdale (pick up only)

Platform 7 and 8:
  all stations and limited express services to Flinders Street
  all stations and limited express services to Flinders Street
  all stations and limited express services to Flinders Street
  weekday all stations and limited express services to Flinders Street

Platform 9 and 10:
  all stations and limited express services to Belgrave
  all stations and limited express services to Lilydale
  all stations and limited express services to Glen Waverley
  weekday all stations and limited express services to Alamein

Transport links

Kinetic Melbourne operates one route via Richmond station, under contract to Public Transport Victoria:
 : Elsternwick station – Clifton Hill

Yarra Trams operates one route via Richmond station:
 : Docklands (Waterfront City) – Wattle Park

Gallery

References

External links

 Melway map at street-directory.com.au

Premium Melbourne railway stations
Railway stations in Australia opened in 1859
Railway stations in Melbourne
Railway stations in the City of Yarra